Edward Joseph Leonski (December 12, 1917 – November 9, 1942) was a United States Army soldier and serial killer responsible for the strangling murders of three women in Melbourne, Australia in 1942. Leonski was dubbed The Brownout Strangler, after Melbourne's wartime practice of dropping the electricity voltage to conserve energy. His self-confessed motive for the killings was a twisted fascination with female voices, especially when they were singing, and his claim that he killed the women to "get their voices".

Leonski was court-martialed for murder under American military law, found guilty, and executed. He was the first and only citizen of another country to have been tried and sentenced to death in Australia under the law of their own country.

Early life
The sixth child of Russian-Jewish immigrants John Leonski, laborer, and his wife Amelia, née Harkavitz, in Kenvil, New Jersey, Leonski grew up in an abusive, alcoholic family. One of his brothers was committed to a mental institution. According to a psychologist who interviewed Leonski during his trial, his mother had been overprotective and controlling. Leonski had been bullied by other neighborhood kids and called a mama's boy. Accordingly, the psychologist ruled that Leonski's crimes were born of his resentment and hatred of his mother and thus constituted "symbolic matricide."

Leonski worked for a time as a delivery boy.

Military service
He was called up for the U.S. Army in February 1941 and arrived in Melbourne, Australia, on February 2, 1942, after the United States had entered World War II. The Army had set up a temporary base (Camp Pell) in Royal Park just north of the city and the university.

Murders
On May 3, 1942, Ivy Violet McLeod, 40, was found dead in Albert Park, Melbourne. She had been beaten and strangled, and because she was found to be in possession of her purse it was evident that robbery was not the motive. Six days later 31-year-old Pauline Thompson was strangled after a night out. She was last seen in the company of a young man who was described as having an American accent.

Gladys Hosking, 40, was the next victim, murdered on May 18 while walking home from work at the Chemistry Department at the University of Melbourne. That same night, another woman said that a dishevelled American man had approached her asking for directions, seemingly out of breath and covered with mud. This description matched the individual Thompson was seen with on the night of her murder, as well as the descriptions given by several women who had survived recent attacks. These survivors and other witnesses were able to pick 24-year-old Leonski out of a line-up of American servicemen who were stationed in Melbourne. Leonski, a private in the 52nd Signal Battalion, was arrested and charged with three murders.

Trial and execution
Although Leonski's crimes were committed in Australia, the trial was conducted under American military law. Leonski confessed to the crimes and was convicted and sentenced to death at a general court-martial on July 17, 1942. American general Douglas MacArthur confirmed the sentence on October 14, and a board of review, appointed by MacArthur, upheld the findings and sentence on October 28. General Court-Martial Order 1 promulgated Leonski's death sentence on November 1. In a departure from normal procedure, on November 4, MacArthur personally signed the order of execution (in subsequent executions this administrative task was entrusted to MacArthur's Chief of Staff, Richard Sutherland). Leonski was hanged at HM Prison Pentridge on November 9.

Leonski's defence attorney, former Colorado lawyer Lieutenant Ira C. Rothgerber, Jr. (1913–1993), attempted to win an external review, even from the U.S. Supreme Court, but was unable to do so. Rothgerber was likewise court-martialled on MacArthur’s orders for insubordination in questioning the Army’s handling of the case.

Leonski was temporarily interred at several cemeteries in Australia. His remains were eventually permanently interred in Section 9, Row B, Site 8 at Schofield Barracks Post Cemetery on the island of O'ahu, Hawaii. His grave is located in a section of the facility reserved for prisoners who died in military custody.

Media portrayals
In the 1950s, the case was the subject of a two-episode radio dramatization titled "A Strong Man", which was part of a series titled D24. In keeping with usual practice on the series, some names and details were changed, although the dramatization otherwise followed events faithfully.

A 1986 feature film, Death of a Soldier, directed by Philippe Mora, was based on Leonski, who was played by American actor Reb Brown.

It is believed that the Australian painter Albert Tucker's Images of Modern Evil series was somewhat influenced by Leonski's murders.

The 2015 television program Inside the Mind of a Serial Killer (series one, episode one) focused on Leonski.

See also
 List of serial killers by country

Footnotes

References
 Chapman, Ivan D., Private Eddie Leonski, the Brownout Strangler, Hale & Iremonger, (Sydney), 1982.
 Dower, Alan, "Women sang for this strangler", The (Melbourne) Herald, (Saturday, 11 April 1953), p.14.
 Killed to show his Strength, The (Perth) Mirror, (Saturday, 19 April 1952), p.8.
 Leonski, Enigma In Life And In Death, Carries His Secret To Grave: Singlet Vital Clue, The (Sydney) Truth, (Sunday, 15 November 1942), p.14.
 Mallon, Andrew, Leonski: The Brown-Out Murders, Outback Press, (Collingwood), 1979.
 Mathews, Jack, "When the Whole Truth is Not Enough", The Age, (Tuesday, 15 October 1985), p.14.
 Mann, Harry, "'So Long Pal, They're Gonna Give Me A Face Lift!': Brutal Slayer Of 3 Women Joked On His Execution Day", The (Perth) Mirror, (Saturday, 19 April 1952), p.8.
 Shaw, Ian W., Murder at Dusk: How US Soldier and Psychopath Eddie Leonski Terrorised Wartime Melbourne, Hachette Australia, (Sydney), 2018.

National Archives of Australia
 A472: W7493: Part 1: "Court Martial of Edward J. Leonski Pages 10-338 excepting pp 192 & 193 which numbers were missed by the typist, and 240 which is missing."
 A472: W7493: Part 2: "Transcript of Evidence - Leonski Murder Trial - U.S. Military Forces Pages 1-388 and covering letter."
 A472: W7493: Part 3: "Records of Trial Leonski, Edward J. U.S. ARMY Prosecution Exhibits Nos 1 and 51." (NAA catalog entry)
 A472: W7493: Part 4: "Record of trial of Leonski, Edward J. Supplement A (Exhibits)."
 A472: W7493: Part 5: "Court Martial of Edward J. Leonski." (NAA catalog entry)
 A816: 1/301/542: "Private E.J. Leonski." (NAA catalog entry)
 MP508/1: 4/702/943: "Trials of American Servicemen for Crimes under Aust. Law Case of Pte E J Leonski."
 A5954: 287/6: "Leonski Case. Representations to Commander in Chief, Southwest Pacific Area. October 1942."

Australian National Maritime Museum
 00017254: Three page handwritten letter by United States soldier Private Edward Leonski: page one of a letter, apparently addressed to "Rene", written while Leonski was in custody in Melbourne. (ANMM catalog entry)
 00017255: Three page handwritten letter by United States soldier Private Edward Leonski: page two of a letter, apparently addressed to "Rene", written while Leonski was in custody in Melbourne. (ANMM catalog entry)
 00017256: Three page handwritten letter by United States soldier Private Edward Leonski: page three of a letter, apparently addressed to "Rene", written while Leonski was in custody in Melbourne. (ANMM catalog entry)
 Hyde, Penny, "The Prosecutor and the Perpetrator: Murder in Melbourne…", Australian National Maritime Museum, 23 November 2012.

External links
Australian Dictionary of Biography Online

1917 births
1942 deaths
20th-century executions of American people
Executed people from New Jersey
American people of Polish descent
American people of Russian descent
American people of Russian-Jewish descent
Executed American serial killers
Male serial killers
Murder in Melbourne
United States Army soldiers
United States Army personnel of World War II
United States Army personnel who were court-martialed
People convicted of murder by the United States military
People executed by the United States military by hanging
People from Morris County, New Jersey